Takayanagi (written: 高柳 lit "tall willow") is a Japanese surname. Notable people with the surname include:

, Japanese footballer
, Japanese television pioneer
, Japanese jazz musician
, Japanese cinematographer
, Japanese long jumper
, Japanese anime director
, Japanese volleyball player
, Japanese voice actress
, Japanese fencer

Fictional characters
, a character in the manga series Tenjho Tenge

See also
9080 Takayanagi, a main-belt asteroid
Takayanagi, Niigata, a dissolved town in Kariwa District, Niigata, Japan
Takayanagi Station, a railway station in Kashiwa, Chiba Prefecture, Japan

Japanese-language surnames